The Church of St Nectan is the parish church of Hartland, Devon, England. Sometimes referred to as the "Cathedral of North Devon", it is located in the hamlet of Stoke, about 1.5 miles (2.4 km) west of the town of Hartland. It is dedicated to Saint Nectan.

History 
Saint Nectan was one of many Celtic hermits and missionaries associated with early Christian sites in south-west Britain, South Wales and Ireland in the fifth and sixth centuries.  A well 100 metres from the church is the reputed site of his hermitage.

The history of the area is obscure; however, the first recorded building here was a collegiate church served by twelve secular canons founded ca. 1050 by Gytha, Countess of Wessex (mother of King Harold). Traditionally the church was founded in thanksgiving for the preservation of her husband's life in a storm at sea; a better tradition associates her husband Godwin, Earl of Wessex and holder of the royal manor of Harton, with the foundation.

Nothing is known of the earliest building nor whether it was rebuilt or enlarged when the collegiate church was replaced by a house of Augustinian regulars at Hartland Abbey in the twelfth century.

The current building, believed to date from 1360, replaced the earlier church on the site, of which only the font still remains and is thought to date from 1170.  The 128 ft tower, rising in four stages, claimed to be the highest in Devon, has for centuries been a landmark to sailors at sea. It was built about sixty years after the rest of the church and it contains a peal of six bells cast in nearby Buckland Brewer by John Taylor & Co and last rehung in 1952, weighing practically 3 tons.  The arch of the tower, open today, once housed a musicians' gallery where the 'church orchestra' of fiddles, double bass, flute and clarinet played for services.

Notable features

The magnificent rood screen (the finest in North Devon), dating from 1450, is a massive structure of eleven bays, 45 ft 6 in long, 12 ft 6 in high and 5 ft 10 in wide at the top.  Earlier times saw both the organ and seating on top of the screen. Other features of great interest include the fine Norman font and the old wagon roofs. The monuments include an elaborate medieval tomb-chest, a small brass of 1610 and a metal-inlaid lid of a churchyard tomb of 1618.

The church contains a set of five windows by the glass painters Caroline Townshend and Joan Howson which depict the history of the parish. A further window by Townshend & Howson is installed at St John's Chapel of Ease in Hartland Square. The main east window and the tower window are by Christopher Webb. There are at least two windows by Alfred Beer - south sanctuary and east chancel chapel; it is possible that the removed but retained glass from the south chancel chapel window is also by Beer.

The whole building is fitted out with a fine if plain set of pews mostly dating from the 16th-century.

The graveyard of St. Nectan's is the burial place of Mary Norton, a children's writer, whose most famous work is The Borrowers.

List of clergy 

2018 - The Reverend Jane Skinner   Team Rector

Services 
Sunday:
 1st: 11:00 United Service
 2nd: 11:00 Sung Eucharist
 3rd: 10:00 Breakfast Church - all-age worship at the Methodist Church
 4th: 11:00 Sung Eucharist
 5th: 11:00 Team Service at varying locations

Weekdays (in the Church Rooms):
 08:00 Morning Prayer
 11:00 Holy Communion (Wednesday)

See also
 North Devon Coast AONB

References 

 Warmington, B. H. (1996) Guide to the Church of St. Nectan
 Manley, T. (ed.), Hartland Times

External links

 Hartland Coast Mission Community
 

Hartland, Church of Saint Nectan
Hartland
Hartland, Devon